Gillian Mary Apps (born November 2, 1983) is a women's ice hockey player. Apps was a member of the Canadian National Hockey Team that won back to back Gold Medals in three consecutive Olympic Games.

As a psychology major at Dartmouth College in Hanover, New Hampshire, United States, Apps was a member of her college's ice hockey team, competing in ECAC women's ice hockey. She was a member of the Canada women's national ice hockey team, winning gold medals at the 2006 Winter Olympics in Turin, Italy, the 2010 Winter Olympics in Vancouver, British Columbia, Canada and the 2014 Winter Olympics in Sochi, Russia. She was also a winner of gold medals with Team Canada at the 2004 and 2007 World Ice Hockey Championships, and silver medals in that event in 2005, 2008, 2009, 2011 and 2013.

Apps was a member of the Brampton Thunder in the Canadian Women's Hockey League until 2015 at which point she announced her retirement from professional women's hockey. Apps resides in Unionville, Ontario.

Playing career
 She graduated from Havergal College in Toronto in 2001, and played for the Toronto Aeros. During the 2000–01 NWHL season, Apps played with the Beatrice Aeros and finished tied for fifth in league scoring with 42 points. In 2001–02, Apps was a member of the Beatrice Aeros and won the Ontario senior women's hockey championship.
 At the first National Women's Under-18 Hockey Challenge in 2001 at Trois-Rivières, Quebec, Apps was the captain of the gold medal winning Ontario Red squad. She made Canada's national women's team only months later, as an 18-year-old. 
 As a freshman with the Dartmouth Big Green women's ice hockey program in 2002, Apps accumulated 22 goals, 13 assists and 35 points. Apps ranked fourth on the Big Green in scoring. She was on an All-Freshman line with Tiffany Hagge and Cherie Piper.
 On October 21, 2012, Apps would score the game-winning goal in a 4-3 overtime win against the Toronto Furies. Said goal provided Florence Schelling with the first win of her CWHL career, which was also her CWHL debut.
 On August 30, 2015 Apps completed the Muskoka Ironman triathlon in just under 15 hours. In September 2015 she retired from the Canadian women's team, after sitting out the 2014-2015 season from both the national team and her CWHL team, the Brampton Thunder. Apps finished her national team career with 50 goals and 50 assists for an even 100 points in 164 games, and ranks second all-time on the Canadian team in penalty minutes behind Hayley Wickenheiser with 255.  She is involved with She Swings She Scores, a joint initiative between the Ontario Women's Hockey Association and the Golf Association of Ontario to encourage girls to take up golf as well as hockey.

Coaching career
In the autumn of 2016, Apps joined Katie King's coaching staff with the Boston College Eagles women's ice hockey program.

Career stats

Dartmouth

Hockey Canada

Awards and honours
Honorable mention All-Ivy selection (2003)
ECAC Hockey League Player of the Week on Nov 3, 2003
ECAC Hockey League Player of the Week on Nov 24, 2003
Named All-Ivy League second team (2004)
Named Honorable mention All-ECAC Hockey League (2004)
2006–07 ECAC Coaches Preseason All-League Selection
2006–07 ECAC Media Preseason All-League Selection
ECAC Player of the Year (2007)
ECAC First-Team all-league honors (2007)
New England Hockey Writers Most Valuable Player (2007)
Top 10 Finalist for 2007 Patty Kazmaier Award

Personal life
She attended William Berczy Public School in Unionville, Ontario. Apps also participates in snowboarding, wakeboarding, golf, and soccer. She grew up playing girls hockey in the GTA. She attended Havergal College where she excelled as a female athlete. Prior to the 2010 Olympics, Apps worked at the Royal Bank of Canada in an Olympians program, where she was called upon to meet clients or give motivational speeches to employees.

She is the granddaughter of Canadian professional ice hockey player for the Toronto Maple Leafs from 1936 to 1948, Hockey Hall of Fame member Syl Apps and the daughter of  Canadian retired professional ice hockey centre who played 10 seasons in the National Hockey League for the New York Rangers, Los Angeles Kings and Pittsburgh Penguins Syl Apps Jr. Her brother, Syl Apps III was signed as a Free Agent by the Toronto Maple Leafs on July 22, 1999, although he never played a game with the Maple Leafs. Her sister, Amy was a member of the Canadian National women's soccer team and an OUA All Star in 1998 and 1999. Her cousin, rower Darren Barber, won a gold medal in coxed eights at the 1992 Summer Olympics in Barcelona as a member of the Canadian team. Barber also competed at the 1996 Summer Olympics in Atlanta, where he finished 4th. Apps's sister-in-law is Meaghan Sittler, whose father Darryl Sittler competed in the NHL. She is the aunt to a nephew named Sawyer.

On April 17, 2012, Apps (along with Meghan Agosta, Caroline Ouellette, Courtney Birchard, and head coach Dan Church) took part in the opening face off of the playoff game between the Ottawa Senators and the New York Rangers at ScotiaBank Place.

On September 22, 2018, she married American women's hockey player Meghan Duggan. Their son, George, was born on February 29, 2020. They then have a daughter, Olivia, one year later.

References

External links
 Dartmouth College biography for Gillian Apps
 Canadian Broadcasting Corporation biography for Gillian Apps

1983 births
Brampton Thunder players
Canadian expatriate ice hockey players in the United States
Canadian women's ice hockey centres
Dartmouth Big Green women's ice hockey players
Havergal College alumni
Ice hockey players at the 2006 Winter Olympics
Ice hockey players at the 2010 Winter Olympics
Ice hockey players at the 2014 Winter Olympics
LGBT ice hockey players
Canadian LGBT sportspeople
Living people
Medalists at the 2006 Winter Olympics
Medalists at the 2010 Winter Olympics
Medalists at the 2014 Winter Olympics
Olympic gold medalists for Canada
Olympic ice hockey players of Canada
Olympic medalists in ice hockey
Sportspeople from North York
Ice hockey people from Toronto